This is a list of electricity-generating power stations in the U.S. state of Utah, sorted by type and name. In 2020, Utah had a total summer capacity of 9,263 MW through all of its power plants, and a net generation of 37,087 GWh. The corresponding electrical energy generation mix in 2021 was 61.8% coal, 24.7% natural gas, 8.1% solar, 1.9% wind, 1.8% hydroelectric, 0.8% geothermal, and 0.2% biomass. Waste heat recovered from industrial operations and oil (0.4%) generated the remainder.

Small-scale solar including customer-owned photovoltaic panels delivered an additional net 654 GWh to Utah's electricity grid in 2021. This compares as less than one-fifth the amount generated by Utah's utility-scale PV plants. Coal previously generated 81% of Utah's electricity in 2013 and has been undergoing a gradual replacement with natural gas and renewables.

Natural-fuels power stations
Data from the U.S. Energy Information Administration serves as a general reference.

Coal-fired

Oil-fired

Natural gas-fired

Renewable power stations
Data from the U.S. Energy Information Administration serves as a general reference.

Biomass

Geothermal

Hydroelectric

Wind

Solar photovoltaic

Natural Bridges National Monument Solar Power System, 50 kW
Soleil Lofts, 5.3MW with 12.8MWh battery

Nuclear power stations
Although there are currently no nuclear power stations in Utah, the Blue Castle Project is working through the process of building the state's first nuclear power plant near Green River, Utah. It is projected to be completed in 2030.

References

External links

Utah
 
Lists of buildings and structures in Utah